Mario Pinball Land, known in Europe and Japan as Super Mario Ball, is a pinball video game developed by Fuse Games and published by Nintendo for the Game Boy Advance, released in 2004. It is the ninth Mario game for the Game Boy Advance and is considered a spin-off into the Super Mario series of games. The game also got a re-release for the Wii U Virtual Console.

Gameplay

To proceed, Mario must collect enough stars to open specific doors, a gameplay element borrowed from Super Mario 64. There are 35 stars to collect in total. Mario must explore different areas to reach his aim of saving the princess. There are five different worlds, each guarded by a boss. The worlds consist of the Fun Fair (the main starting area), Grassy Greens, Frosty Frontier, Shifting Sands, and Bowser's Castle.

Plot
Mario and Princess Peach visit a funfair and wait in line to try a ride called the Air Cannon, where the rider is turned into a ball via the Spherasizer and shot out of the cannon. As Peach is about to take her turn, two Goombas kidnap her by aiming the cannon towards Bowser's Castle. To save Peach, Mario uses the Spherasizer to turn into a ball, allowing for the pinball action of the game.

Development
As Adrian Barritt and Richard Horrocks, veterans of the Pro Pinball series, had founded Fuse Games, they decided that, in the words of Barritt "we needed a bit of impact before they would even bother to speak to us". So they thought about a Mario pinball game, and produced a playable demo, featuring both the possible first area and the last one with a showdown with Bowser. Afterwards Barritt and Horrocks went to Seattle to pitch the idea to Nintendo of America executives, and were approved. As the resources were limited, Fuse decided not to develop the game for the Nintendo GameCube, resorting to the Game Boy Advance instead. Barritt added that he considered the  portable "[an] ideal platform for a pinball game, something that you can just pick up and knock the ball around for a bit" and stated that "with experience on systems like the Super Nintendo we knew we'd be able to push the hardware of the GBA very hard to its limits". Despite Fuse hiring more people, the whole game was created by a small team of only five people.

Mario Pinball Land was first announced under the working title of Mario Pinball in Nintendo's product release schedule on April 1, 2004 as one of two previously unannounced Mario titles for the GBA alongside an untitled new entry in the Mario Party series that would make use of the handheld's e-Reader peripheral, with a planned release date of May 24. Further details were later revealed during the 2004 E3 expo, with playable demos and a release date of October 4. The game's final name was announced in June 2004 on Nintendo's official website.

Reception

Mario Pinball Land received "mixed" reviews according to the review aggregation website Metacritic.  In Japan, Famitsu gave it a score of three sevens and one eight for a total of 29 out of 40.

Most reviews praised the excellent graphics, but criticized the game for being pointlessly difficult and having overall poor gameplay. IGN's review in particular criticized the gameplay for having "bad table layouts with an overwhelmingly annoying 'playfield reset' element". The review concluded that "the gameplay itself is far more flawed and annoying than it is fun to play". Adrian Barritt later admitted that during development they wound up not making the game easy enough for pinball beginners as "you had to take the time to control the ball", which led to Fuse trying to not repeat the same mistakes in follow-up Metroid Prime Pinball. Not all reviews were negative, however, as GameSpot said that the game "combines Mario with pinball to create an interesting kind of adventure game".

Nintendo World Report gave the game a 7.5/10.

References

External links
Fuse Games Limited MPL page
Nintendo SMB page: Japan GBA, Japan WUVC, UK WUVC

2004 video games
Game Boy Advance games
Pinball video games
Video games developed in the United Kingdom
Video games with isometric graphics
Video games about size change
Virtual Console games
Virtual Console games for Wii U
Single-player video games
Mario spin-off games